Hatefuck may refer to:

 "Hatefuck", a song by the Bravery from Stir the Blood
 "Hatefuck", a song by Cruel Youth from +30mg
 "Hatefuck", a song by Motionless in White from Infamous
 "Hatefuck", a song by Pussy Riot featuring Slayyyter from Matriarchy Now